Carrion plant is a common name for several plants with foul smelling flowers and may refer to:

 Stapelia grandiflora, native to South Africa
 Stapelia gigantea

See also
 Carrion flower